 

  
Esprit Calvet (28 November 1728 – 25 July 1810) was a French physician and collector.

Calvet came from a long established family in Avignon and was educated at the Jesuit college in the town. He studied medicine at the university in Avignon, in Montpellier and then in Paris. He returned to Avignon and became the first Professor of Medicine at the university. He eventually became the chief doctor of the Hôpitaux Sainte-Marte. 

In his last will, dated 10 January 1810, Calvet donated his cabinet of curiosities, his library and a few pictures to the town of Avignon. The donation was accepted by Napoleon I in a decree dated 9 April 1811. The collection is housed in the Musee Calvert on rue Joseph Vernet in Avignon.

See also
Fondation Calvet

References

Sources


Further reading

External links
Fondation Calvet, official site
Musée Calvet & Musée Lapidaire, official site

1728 births
1810 deaths
French art collectors
18th-century French physicians